The Galapagos Affair: Satan Came to Eden is a 2013 feature-length documentary directed by Daniel Geller and Dayna Goldfine. It is about a series of unsolved disappearances on the Galapagos island of Floreana in the 1930s among the largely European expatriate residents at the time. The voice cast includes Cate Blanchett, Sebastian Koch, Thomas Kretschmann, Diane Kruger, Connie Nielsen, Josh Radnor and Gustaf Skarsgård.

It features the 1934 silent film The Empress of Floreana in its entirety, but the four-minute short is split into halves.

Cast (voices) 
Cate Blanchett as Dore Strauch
Sebastian Koch as Heinz Wittmer
Thomas Kretschmann as Friedrich Ritter
Diane Kruger  as Margret Wittmer
Connie Nielsen as Baroness Von Wagner
Josh Radnor as John Garth
Gustaf Skarsgård as Rolf Blomberg

Release
The film premiered at the 40th Telluride Film Festival on September 2, 2013. It was an official selection of the Hamptons International Film Festival on October 12, 2013, and Berlin International Film Festival on February 10, 2014. It opened theatrically in the US on April 4, 2014.

Critical response
On review aggregator Rotten Tomatoes, the film holds an approval rating of 83% based on 53 reviews, with an average rating of 6.92/10. The website's critics consensus reads: "It doesn't quite live up to its marvelously lurid premise, but The Galapagos Affair is still stranger than fiction in a very entertaining way." On Metacritic, the film has a weighted average score of 69 out of 100, based on 21 critics, indicating "generally favorable reviews".

References

External links

Q&A with directors at HamptonsFilmFest.org

2013 films
Films set on the Galápagos Islands
2013 documentary films
American documentary films
Documentary films about crime
2010s English-language films
2010s American films